Anton Petter (born April 12, 1781 in Vienna; died May 14, 1858 in Vienna) was a painter from the Austrian Empire.

Biography
He visited Rome in 1808. In 1820 he became professor at the academy of Vienna, and in 1828 he was named director of that institution.

Honors
He won several prizes at the academy of Vienna, to which he was admitted in 1814 in reward for his “Meleager murdered by his Mother in the Arms of his Wife.”

Works
Among his works are:
 “Meeting of Maximilian with his Bride, Mary of Burgundy”
 “Rudolph of Habsburg”
 “Queen Joan beside the Coffin of her Husband Philip”
 “Charles V. visiting his Prisoner, Francis I”

References

1780s births
1858 deaths
Painters from the Austrian Empire
Academic staff of the Academy of Fine Arts Vienna